Tom E. Lewis (traditional name: Balang Lewis; 25 August 1958 – 10 May 2018) was an Australian actor and musician. He was an Indigenous Australian from the Murrungun people. His first major role was the title role in the 1978 Fred Schepisi film The Chant of Jimmie Blacksmith.

Biography

Early life
He was born and grew up in  Ngukurr, Arnhem Land, Northern Territory. He worked as a bricklayer and stockman before moving into theatre.

Theatre career
He spent many years working in the Melbourne theatre scene, having worked with Playbox, Melbourne Theatre Company, Melbourne Workers Theatre, Arena and Handspan Theatres. With Handspan, he devised the internationally successful Lift Em Up Socks, a semi-autobiographical multi-media work. In 2006, he played Othello in the Darwin Theatre Company's production of Shakespeare's classic.

In 2013, Tom played "an indigenous version of King Lear" in the Darwin Theatre Company production The Shadow King.

Music career
Lewis was also a musician and played the didgeridu, flute, clarinet and guitar. Musical projects include the band Circle of Breathing. In the 1990s he toured in acclaimed jazz duo, Lewis & Young through Europe, Asia and Australia. He has played with Jane Rutter, Eve Duncan, Uli Klein and composer George Dreyfus. In 2000 he was chosen to run with the Olympic torch in Melbourne. In 2005, he released the album Sunshine After Rain through label Skinnyfish music. In 2013, he released Beneath the Sun, also through the Skinnyfish label.

Movie career
He played the title role in the 1978 Fred Schepisi film The Chant of Jimmie Blacksmith, after being discovered by Schepisi's wife at an airport. He co-wrote a short documentary film, Yellow Fella, about his experience of coming from a mixed race heritage, for which he was awarded the 2005 Bob Maza Fellowship by the Australian Film Commission. Directed by Ivan Sen, it was selected to screen at the Cannes Film Festival, the first Australian Indigenous documentary ever chosen for Official Selection.

Lewis considered his artistic creations to be "medicine and good stories for people – like a Corroboree ground but in the modern world". He worked on Dust Echoes, an Indigenous animated website of Dreamtime stories produced by the ABC. Dust Echoes is important he said, "to preserve our culture by using the whitefella technology to embrace our stories. You see the 'propaganda' is bigger than our stories in the dust and so we now are raising those stories from the dust and share it, so people can more understand our culture and bring them to our fireplace." He played one of the leading roles in the psychological thriller Red Hill. One of his last major roles was in Boori Monty Pryor's 4-part miniseries Wrong Kind of Black. 

His final movie role was in the 2020 documentary-drama The Skin of Others directed by Tom Murray, where he played the lead role of Indigenous WW1 hero Douglas Grant, while also commenting on the state of Aboriginal and non-Aboriginal relations from his own personal perspective. A reviewer in The Guardian wrote that: 'one leaves the film with a powerful impression of Lewis as an artist and an intellect; as a person fascinated by stories and compelled towards the process of artistic creation'.

Personal life
Lewis had been living in Beswick, South Arnhem Land since 2001 where he has initiated a cultural foundation, the Djilpin Arts Aboriginal Corporation, which hosts the "Walking with the Spirits" festival each year.

Death
Lewis died of a heart attack on 10 May 2018 in the Northern Territory town of Katherine.

Filmography

Discography 
 Recorded Messages: Violin
 Sunshine After Rain (2005)
 Beneath the Sun (2013)

Awards

Australia Council for the Arts
The Australia Council for the Arts is the arts funding and advisory body for the Government of Australia. Since 1993, it has awarded a Red Ochre Award. It is presented to an outstanding Indigenous Australian (Aboriginal Australian or Torres Strait Islander) artist for lifetime achievement.

|-
| 2006
| himself
| Red Ochre Award
| 
|-

 Best actor:Canberra Short Film Festival:International Category (2017)
 Bob Maza Fellowship (2005)

References

External links
 

1958 births
2018 deaths
Australian composers
Australian male composers
Australian musicians
Indigenous Australian male actors
Indigenous Australian musicians
People from the Northern Territory